Mimeograph is an EP consisting of recordings by American country/rock band Old 97's. It was released on July 6, 2010. The EP contains four cover songs, originally recorded by The Rolling Stones, The Fratellis, R.E.M., and David Bowie.

Track listing
 "Rocks Off" (Jagger/Richards) - 4:24
 "For The Girl" (John Lawler) - 2:33
 "Driver 8" (Bill Berry, Peter Buck, Mike Mills, Michael Stipe) - 3:22
 "Five Years" (David Bowie) - 4:52

Personnel
Old 97's
Ken Bethea – electric guitar, backing vocals on "Five Years"
Murry Hammond – bass, backing vocals
Rhett Miller – guitars, vocals
Philip Peeples – drums, percussion

Additional Musicians
Rip Rowan - piano and backing vocals on "Rocks Off" and "Five Years"
Salim Nourallah - backing vocals on "Five Years"
Patrick Brink - trumpet on "Rocks Off"
David Butler - trombone on "Rocks Off"

References 

Old 97's albums
2010 albums
New West Records albums
Covers albums